Ostracinda or Ostrakinda was an ancient Greek game for boys, similar to modern Tag (game).

Two sides stand opposite, divided by a line drawn on the ground. A boy throws up a shell or a dish, white on one side and colored black with pitch on the other and each side has one or other of these colors allotted to them. As he throws the shell, he calls νὺξ (night) ἡμέρα (day).
If the white (day) side falls uppermost, the side which represents the day pursues, and the other side runs away; if the black (night) side falls uppermost the roles are reversed. As soon as someone is caught he is called ὄνος and is out of the game.

It is not precisely stated whether the game went on until all the fugitives were caught nor whether there was a point of safety to be reckoned, but it is very likely that the game was played with varying rules at different times and places.

References

Ancient Greek sports